On 14 May 2012, a Dornier 228 passenger aircraft of Agni Air operating Flight CHT, crashed near Jomsom Airport, Nepal, killing 15 of the 21 people on board, including both pilots and Indian child actress Taruni Sachdev and her mother.

Accident 

The aircraft was flying from Pokhara Airport to Jomsom Airport on an unscheduled flight CHT. There were eighteen passengers, two pilots and a flight attendant on board. At 09:30 local time (03:45 UTC), Flight CHT attempted to land at Jomson, but the first attempt was aborted by the pilots. During the subsequent go-around, one of the aircraft's wings impacted a hill, causing the aircraft to crash, killing 15 out of the 21 people on board.

Aircraft
The aircraft involved was a Dornier 228-212 registered as 9N-AIG. It was built by Dornier Flugzeugwerke in 1997 and was operated by Hornbill Skyways before being purchased by Agni Air in 2008.

Passengers and crew 
The victims were two Nepali crew members and 13 passengers, including Indian child actress Taruni Sachdev and her mother. Six other passengers survived with injuries.

See also
Agni Air Flight 101

References

Aviation accidents and incidents in 2012
Aviation accidents and incidents in Nepal
Accidents and incidents involving the Dornier 228
Mustang District
2012 in Nepal 
May 2012 events in Asia
2012 disasters in Nepal